Easington Academy is a secondary school with academy status located in the village of Easington, County Durham, England.

The school was first created as Easington Comprehensive School in 1978, as a result of a merger between Easington Secondary Modern School and Murton Secondary Modern School. The school was later renamed Easington Community School, and then Easington Community Science College in January 2007 after becoming a specialist science college. 
The school has become an academy school, and is now known as Easington Academy.

House system
The school's house names are based on the family surnames most affected in the 1951 Easington Colliery pit disaster; points are allocated in school assemblies, performances, etc.

They Were Named
 Brenkley 
 Dryden 
 Porter 
 Seymour 
 Wallace 

As Of June 2021 They Are Called
 Evolution 
 Ambition 
 Integrity 
 Synergy

Notable former pupils

The school's alumni include such professional footballers as Newcastle goalkeeper Steve Harper, Paul Kitson, Chris Brass, Paul Smith, Richard Ord, Stuart Brightwell, and Adam Johnson.

References

External links
 Easington Academy's official website

Secondary schools in County Durham
Academies in County Durham